Teulisna quadratella is a moth in the family Erebidae. It was described by Jeremy Daniel Holloway in 2001. It is found on Borneo. The habitat consists of lowland dipterocarp forests.

The length of the forewings is 10–12 mm for both males and females.

References

Moths described in 2001
quadratella